Radio Waves may refer to:

 Radio waves, a type of electromagnetic radiation

Music

Albums  
 Radio Waves (The Black Sorrows album), 1996
 Radio Waves (Seigmen album), 1997
 Radio Waves (Joan Osborne album), 2022
 Radio Waves, by Rob Schneiderman, 1991
 Radio Waves, a comedy album by Bob & Tom, 2009

Songs  
 "Radio Waves" (Eli Young Band song), 2009
 "Radio Waves" (Roger Waters song), 1987
 "Radio Waves", by OMD from Dazzle Ships, 1983

Other uses
 Radio Waves (radio station), a radio station in Bhutan
 Radio Waves (novella), a 1995 novella by Michael Swanwick
 Radio Waves: Life and Revolution on the FM Dial, a 1991 book by Jim Ladd

See also 
 Radio Wave 96.5, a defunct radio station in Blackpool, England
 Wave radio (disambiguation)